The Burn Naze was a public house in the English conurbation of Thornton-Cleveleys, Lancashire. Built in 1910, when it replaced the former Burn Naze Inn, it was one of the oldest pubs in the area by the time of its closure in 2019, and was listed as a community asset in 2021. It was demolished in 2022. 

Its name is possibly derived from when the area was known as "Burn" during the time of William the Conqueror. Torentum, today's Thornton, was "estimated to contain six carucates of land fit for the plough, but this computation was exclusive of Rossall and Burn, which were valued at two carucates respectively". "Naze", meanwhile, is "a flat marshy headland". A Burn Naze is mentioned in 1837 by William Thornber, who was on his way to the nearby River Wyre. A 15th-century building known as Burn Hall also existed in the area, with an earlier structure documented back to at least 1345.

The pub closed in 2019, having seen its trade decline significantly since the nearby ICI closed in 1992. It was purchased in November 2020 by Manchester-based housing firm Mangrove Estates, which had plans to build a block of 24 apartments at the location. Wyre Borough Council received a planning application to knock down the pub, but the application was rejected after local community group Save the Burn Naze Pub campaigned against the demolition. The developer appealed successfully and resubmitted its plans. The demolition plans were given the green light in October 2021. Demolition started in February 2022.

See also
Burn Naze Halt railway station

References

External links
Burn Naze – Trust Inns
"Burn Naze Pub - April 2021 - Thornton (past Blackpool)" – Blackpool Fylde & Wyre - History Mystery Heritage!, YouTube, 19 November 2021

Pubs in Lancashire
Buildings and structures in the Borough of Wyre
1910 establishments in England
2022 disestablishments in England
Former pubs in England
Buildings and structures demolished in 2022
Demolished buildings and structures in England